Antonius Hambroek (1607 – 21 July 1661) was a Dutch missionary to Formosa from 1648 to 1661, during the Dutch colonial era. Prior to working in Formosa, Hambroek was a minister in Schipluiden between 1632 and 1647.

History
He was killed by Koxinga as the Chinese warlord wrested Taiwan from the Dutch. Koxinga had captured Hambroek along with his wife and three of his children, and sent him as a messenger to Frederik Coyett, the Governor of Formosa, to demand the surrender of the Dutch garrison at Fort Zeelandia and the abandonment of their colony. Koxinga promised the missionary death should he return with a displeasing answer; Coyett refused to surrender and Hambroek was executed on his return to Koxinga's camp.

After the Siege of Fort Zeelandia, Koxinga took Hambroek's teenage daughter as a concubine. Other Dutch women were sold to Chinese soldiers to become their wives.

Antonius Hambroek, or the Siege of Formosa

The playwright Joannes Nomsz wrote a tragedy for the stage in 1775 about the martyrdom of Hambroek, "Antonius Hambroek, of de Belegering van Formoza" rendered in English as "Antonius Hambroek, or the Siege of Formosa", sealing the missionary's fame in Holland.

The topic of the Chinese taking the Dutch women and the daughter of Antonius Hambroek as concubines was featured in Joannes Nomsz's play, which became famous and well known in Europe. This revealed European anxiety about the fate of the Dutch women and subjection to defeat by non-Europeans.

References

1607 births
1661 deaths
Protestant missionaries in Taiwan
Dutch expatriates in Taiwan
People of Dutch Formosa
Clergy from Rotterdam
Dutch Protestant missionaries
17th-century Christian martyrs